Dimitri Poliakov (born 19 January 1968) is a former professional tennis player from Ukraine.

Career
Poliakov, a clay court specialist and the Soviet singles champion in 1990, had his breakthrough year in 1991, when he won the Yugoslavia Open, an ATP Tour event. This saw him break into the top 100 for the first time. He was also runner-up in the Austrian Open, with partner Pablo Arraya. These would be the only two ATP Tour finals that he reached during his career.

In 1993 he made it into the semi finals of the Kremlin Cup, as qualifier. He defeated number three seed Amos Mansdorf in the opening round and then best Zimbabwean Byron Black 6–0, 6–3 and Martin Damm of the Czech Republic. His tournament ended when he was defeated by Marc Rosset in three sets.

He had one of the best wins of his career in 1992 when he defeated world number 12 Carlos Costa in Vienna in straight sets.

From 1993 to 1998, Poliakov was a regular fixture in the Ukraine Davis Cup team. He had a 10–2 record in singles. His doubles record was 9–5 and seven of those wins came with Andrei Medvedev, which is a national record. He had also played in two Davis Cup campaigns for the Soviet Union team in 1990 and 1991.

He reached the second round of a Grand Slam singles draw on three occasions, twice as a qualifier. In the men's doubles he appeared in three Grand Slam tournaments but never progressed part the first round.

ATP career finals

Singles: 1 (1–0)

Doubles: 1 (0–1)

Challenger titles

Singles: (4)

Doubles: (5)

References

1968 births
Living people
Ukrainian male tennis players
Soviet male tennis players
National University of Kharkiv alumni
Sportspeople from Kyiv